Freda Downie (20 October 1929 – 4 May 1993) was an English poet.

Downie was born in London, growing up in the outskirts of Shooters Hill. The family were evacuated to Northamptonshire at the start of World War II in September 1939.  They returned to London during the Blitz, travelled by sea around Africa to Australia for her father's work in 1941–42.  In 1944, the family returned across the Pacific to London at the time of V-1 and V-2 rockets. As an adult, Downie worked for music publishers and art agents.

Downie only started publishing her poetry in the 1970s.  Her two main published collections were A Stranger Here (1977, Secker) and Plainsong (1981, Secker).  Her Collected Poems, edited by George Szirtes, were published after her death (2003, Bloodaxe).  Downie described her wartime memories in her memoir There'll Always Be an England: a poet's childhood, 1929–1945, written in the last year of her life (2003, Bloodaxe).

Downie's poems have been described as "elegant, full of gently spiked irony, and oblique, wistful glances at everyday events and familiar landscapes".

References

Further reading

1929 births
1993 deaths
English women poets
20th-century English poets
20th-century English women writers
People from Shooter's Hill
Writers from London